Burlington Outlet Village  is an outlet shopping center located just off I-85/40 in Burlington, North Carolina, United States.  Burlington Outlet Village, formerly known as the Burlington Manufacturers Outlet Center (BMOC), was the first factory outlet center to open in North Carolina.

The center consists of multiple buildings - the main portion of the property was originally constructed in 1981.  Additional buildings were constructed in 1983.  The center was renovated in 2007 & 2008.  Renovations included: rebranding, new name, new logo, new marketing campaigns, new store fronts, lighting, signage, parking lots and landscaping to revitalize the center.  Burlington Outlet Village is owned and managed by Anthony & Co. ONCOR International of Raleigh, North Carolina.

The mall is 24 acre large and offers 25 brand name shops.

Location 
Burlington Outlet Village is located just off Interstate 85/Interstate 40, with buildings visible from the highway.  BOV is within an hour's drive of four of the state's five largest cities:  Raleigh, Durham, Greensboro and Winston-Salem.

Access to the property is primarily from Highway 49 (one block from Exit 145 off Interstate 85) onto Plaza Drive, and secondarily from Chapel Hill Road (Highway 54) onto Corporation Pkwy.

Events 
The Burlington Outlet Village is host of several seasonal and local events and sales throughout the year.  These events include:
ACC Heritage Craft Fair
Annual Hospice Auto Show and Fall Festival
Burlington Christmas Market
Community Collection Day
Family Friendly Halloween
Farmers Market

References

External links 
Anthony & Co. ONCOR International website

Outlet malls in the United States
Shopping malls in Burlington, North Carolina
Shopping malls established in 1981